William Thomas King (24 May 1893 – 2 April 1966) was a member of the Queensland Legislative Assembly.

Biography
King was born in Beaudesert, Queensland, the son of James King and his wife Margaret (née Veale). He was educated at Normanton State School, Cooktown Convent School, Christian Brothers College Ipswich, and Christian Brothers College Brisbane. Upon leaving school he qualified for the civil service, securing the highest pass in his year. He qualified as a solicitor and was called to the bar in 1930.

On 4 November 1924 he married Annie Cecilia Smith and together had two sons. Annie died in 1927 and in 1947 he married Maude Mary Eileen Handlin. King died in April 1966 and was buried in the Toowong Cemetery.

Public career
King, for the Labor Party, was the member for Maree in the Queensland Legislative Assembly from 1932 until his defeat in 1941. He was the Chairman of Committees in 1940-1941 and kept a tight rein on debates and conducted the business of committees in an exemplary fashion.

He was also an alderman in the Brisbane City Council, representing the ward of Brisbane from 1928 to 1931.

References

Members of the Queensland Legislative Assembly
1893 births
1966 deaths
Burials at Toowong Cemetery
Australian Labor Party members of the Parliament of Queensland
20th-century Australian politicians